Simon Leviev (born Shimon Yehuda Hayut, 27 September 1990) is an Israeli conman convicted of theft, forgery and fraud. According to The Times of Israel, between 2017 and 2019 he allegedly conned an estimated $10 million from victims across Europe in a Ponzi scheme. His criminal activity became widely known in 2019 after the publication of an article titled "The Tinder Swindler" by investigative journalists from the Norwegian tabloid Verdens Gang, with the support of Israeli journalist Uri Blau, and later with the release of the 2022 Netflix documentary of the same name.

In 2015, Leviev was sentenced to two years in prison in Finland, and in 2019 to 15 months in prison in Israel. As of 2019, he is still wanted in several countries for fraud.

Early life 
Leviev was born Shimon Yehuda Hayut in 1990 in Ramat Elchanan, Bnei Brak, Israel. His father is Yohanan Hayut, the chief rabbi of El Al airlines.
At the age of 15 he moved to Brooklyn, New York in the US with his family's friends, who later accused him of misusing their credit card. According to interviews done by Felicity Morris, Leviev has been committing minor cons like cheque fraud since he was a teenager. He later changed his legal name from Shimon Hayut to Simon Leviev, using the surname Leviev to pretend he was related to Lev Avnerovich Leviev, an Israeli businessman known as "The King of Diamonds".

Criminal activity and legal trouble 
In 2011, Hayut was charged in Israel with theft, forgery, and fraud for cashing stolen checks. According to reports, he stole a checkbook belonging to a family while babysitting their child, and another's while working as a handyman at their home. He never showed up in court and escaped the country across the border into Jordan with a fake passport under the name Mordechai Nisim Tapiro, and fled to Europe. In 2012, he was indicted by an Israeli court and charged with theft and forgery of checks, as well as for leaving a five-year-old he was babysitting unattended. In 2015, he was arrested in Finland and was sentenced to three years in prison for defrauding several women. When arrested in Finland, he claimed he was an Israeli man born in 1978 and was found with two forged Israeli passports, three forged Israeli driver's licenses, two forged Israeli flight permits, and five forged American Express credit cards.

After finishing his sentence early, he returned to Israel to be recharged and sentenced in 2017. However, according to The Times of Israel, he assumed a different identity by changing his legal name to Simon Leviev and fled the country again. Hayut travelled around Europe, pretending to be different people. He exploited several women in Germany using the name Michael Bilton. He also presented himself as the son of Russian-Israeli diamond mogul Lev Leviev, using the dating app Tinder to contact women as Leviev, and tricked them into loaning him money that he never repaid. He would charm women with lavish gifts, taking them to dinners on private jets using money he borrowed from other women he previously conned. He would later pretend he was being targeted by his "enemies", often sending the same messages and images pretending that his bodyguard was attacked, asking his victims to help him financially; they would often take out bank loans and new credit cards in order to help. He would then use the money gained through the deception to lure new victims, while essentially operating a Ponzi scheme. Later, he would pretend to repay his victims by sending forged documents showing fake bank transfers.

In 2019, he was arrested by Interpol in Greece after using a forged passport. Later that year, he was sentenced to 15 months in prison in Israel, but was released five months later as a result of the coronavirus pandemic. According to The Mirror, he later offered "business advice" for a fee via a website. According to The Times of Israel, in 2020 he pretended to be a medical worker to get the COVID-19 vaccine early.

Hayut is also wanted for various fraud and forgery offenses by Norway, Sweden, the United Kingdom and Spain. In an interview with CNN on 21 February 2022, he denied defrauding the women, claiming he was just a "single guy who wanted to meet some girls on Tinder."

In February 2022 attorneys for the Leviev family filed a criminal complaint against Hayut with the Tel Aviv Magistrate's Court, for libelous publications, infringing privacy and violating trademark orders. In July 2022, they filed another criminal complaint against Hayut for damaging the family's name. the hearing of the Leviev family's complaint was postponed after the Israeli prosecutor's office sent a request to postpone the hearing on the grounds that Simon Leviev is the focus of a criminal investigation for the same offenses.

Hayut was in a relationship with Israeli model Kate Konlin, the two continued to be together even after the Netflix documentary came out. However, the two have since broken up and Konlin has accused Hayut of borrowing money from her and emotionally abusing her with similar tactics that he used on his other victims.

In popular culture 
In 2022, Netflix released a video documentary, The Tinder Swindler, which describes his story as told by some of his victims. According to The Washington Post, following the release of the documentary, Tinder banned Hayut from their app. He is also banned from other apps under Match Group Inc, including Match.com, Plenty of Fish, and OkCupid.

In 2022, shortly after the release of the documentary, Leviev signed with talent manager Gina Rodriguez of Gitoni Inc., in hopes of pursuing a career in the entertainment industry. He also has a Cameo account, where he charged $200 for personalized videos and $2,000 for business videos.

References

External links 
 The Tinder Swindler at VG.no
 Simon Leviev claims to be completely innocent in Feb 2023

1990 births
Living people
People convicted of fraud
Israeli fraudsters
Israeli Jews
Pyramid and Ponzi schemes
People from Bnei Brak